Amphilius kakrimensis is a species of catfish in the genus Amphilius. It is found in the Kolenté River and Kakrima River, a tributary of the Kolenté River, in Guinea. Its length reaches 4.2 cm.

References 

kakrimensis
Fish described in 1987
Freshwater fish of West Africa